Haematopodin is the more stable breakdown product of Haematopodin B. Both compounds are found in the mushroom Mycena haematopus, although haematopodin only occurs in trace amounts in fresh fruit bodies. Similar pigments (with the 1,3,4,5-tetrahydropyrrolo[4,3,2-de]quinoline structure), known as batzellins and damirones, have been found in sea sponges.  A chemical synthesis for haematopodin was reported in 1996. Key steps in the synthesis involved the addition of 3-[(2,4-dimethoxybenzyl)amino]-1-propanol to the indolo-6,7-quinone and cyclization of the resulting adduct with trifluoroacetic acid.

References 

Quinoline alkaloids
Alkaloids found in fungi
Biological pigments
Quinones
Nitrogen heterocycles
Oxygen heterocycles
Heterocyclic compounds with 4 rings
Enones
Tetracyclic compounds